Major-General Richard Keith-Jones  (1913–1992) was a British Army officer.

Military career
Keith-Jones was commissioned into the Royal Artillery on 1 February 1934. He saw action in the Italian campaign during the Second World War, for which he was awarded the Military Cross.

After the war he became a GSO2 instructor at the Staff College, Camberley, from September 1949 until December 1951, Commander, Royal Artillery (CRA) for 17th Gurkha Division in July 1957 and General Officer Commanding 50th (Northumbrian) Division/District of the Territorial Army in March 1964 before retiring in July 1966.

He was appointed a Member of the Order of the British Empire in the 1947 Birthday Honours and a Companion of the Order of the Bath in the 1968 New Year Honours.

References

External links
British Army Officers 1939−1945

1913 births
1992 deaths
British Army major generals
Companions of the Order of the Bath
Members of the Order of the British Empire
Recipients of the Military Cross
Royal Artillery officers
Academics of the Staff College, Camberley
Graduates of the Royal College of Defence Studies
People educated at Clifton College
Graduates of the Royal Military Academy, Woolwich
British Army personnel of World War II
Military personnel of British India